Hiram na Anak (International title: Borrowed Embrace / ) is a 2019 Philippine television drama family series broadcast by GMA Network. Directed by Gil Tejada Jr., it stars Yasmien Kurdi, Dion Ignacio and Leanne Bautista in the title role. It premiered on February 25, 2019 on the network's afternoon line up replacing Don't Dare to Dream. The series concluded on May 3, 2019, with a total of 48 episodes.

The series is streaming online on YouTube.

Cast and characters

Lead cast
 Yasmien Kurdi as Miren Alonta-Sandejo
 Dion Ignacio as Adrian Sandejo
 Leanne Bautista as Bernadette "Duday" A. Sandejo

Supporting cast
 Paolo Contis as Benjo Alvarez
 Lauren Young as Odessa "Dessa" Saint 
 Empress Schuck as Rowena "Wena" Barrion-Alvarez
 Vaness del Moral as Alma Alonta
 Sef Cadayona as Vince Urbanez
 Maey Bautista as Engke Magpugay
 Rita Avila as Hilda Sandejo

Guest cast
 Kim Belles as Janice
 James Merilo as Arvi
 Marnie Lapus as Maggie
 Tony Mabesa as Pedro
 Tonio Quiazon as Renato
 Kiel Rodriguez as Alex 
 Lao Rodriguez as Pabs
 Brylle Mondejar as Martinez
 John Philip Koch as Rigor

Accolades

References

External links
 
 

2019 Philippine television series debuts
2019 Philippine television series endings
Filipino-language television shows
GMA Network drama series
Television shows set in the Philippines